José Victor Oliver Ledesma (born 14 may 1912 in Arecibo, Puerto Rico) was a Puerto Rican industrialist owner of Puerto Rico Distillers.

Oliver Ledesma graduated with a degree in engineering from Cornell University in June 1936, having been excused from taking his final exams his senior year. By 1937, he held the position of Treasurer of Puerto Rico Distillers Corporation. By 1941 he was the first President of "Licoreria Roses". While at Licoreria Roses, he created a subsidiary called Ron Rico Corporation which was a pioneer in the United States rum market. Later he coordinated the merger of Ron Rico with Seagrams, and which led to the creation of Puerto Rico Distillers.

He married Blanca Miguelina Correa. He was a member of Phi Sigma Alpha fraternity.

References

1912 births
People from Arecibo, Puerto Rico
Cornell University alumni
Year of death missing
Seagram